Wob (formerly called World of Books) is a second-hand book retailer, reported to be the United Kingdom's largest. The company buys unsold inventory of used books mostly from UK charity shops. The books are resold either to consumers through Wob's website and various online sites, or wholesale to recyclers, with about 80% of the books going to recycling. It was certified as a B Corporation in 2019.

Overview
The company purchases books in bulk, paying by tonnage rather than for individual titles. Using custom-designed software, they evaluate each title for saleability and set selling prices accordingly. The company buys used books through shops and recycling merchants, in addition to purchasing books directly from consumers through its proprietary Ziffit, which has a 'scan and send' app. In 2010 alone, the business recycled 26 million books.

Wob belongs to the World of Books Group, which also includes Ziffit and Shopiago, both re-commerce companies. The group describes itself as a "circular economy, for-profit company".

Wob was founded in 2002 by Simon Downes, Ben Maxfield and Michael Laundon, who had bought their first books at car boot sales and auctioned them on eBay.

Annualised turnover in 2009 was £5 million, with a projected turnover for that year of £8.5 million. The business was receiving 140 tonnes per week (about 300,000 books) at their depot, purchased from charities at £75 per tonne.

In 2009, World of Books won the Worthing Business Award for New Business of the Year.

In December 2012, World of Books was ranked in 22nd place in the Sunday Times Fast Track 100. In 2018, it was number 197 in the Sunday Times HSBC International Track 200.

In November 2016, it was sold to a fund by Bridges Fund Management, which bought a majority stake for £13 million. At the time, the company reported collecting more than 25,000 tonnes of books per year from 3,700 charity shops across the UK, out of an estimated 50,000 total tonnes in the market.

In 2021, Bridges sold a majority stake in World of Books to Livingbridge, a British private equity firm. They rebranded from World of Books to Wob in November 2021.

See also 
 musicMagpie
 Better World Books
 AbeBooks
 Alibris
 Momox
 List of online booksellers

References

Bookshops of the United Kingdom
Companies based in West Sussex
Bookstores established in the 20th century
Book selling websites
B Lab-certified corporations